Davey Williams was an American baseball player.

Davey Williams may also refer to:

Davey Williams (American football) (born 1954), American football player
Davey Williams (musician) (1952–2019), American free improvisation and avant-garde music guitarist

See also
Dave Williams (disambiguation)
David Williams (disambiguation)